The Green may refer to:
 The Green (band), a reggae, pop, and soul band from Hawaii
 The Green (Charlotte, North Carolina), a 1.5-acre park in uptown Charlotte, North Carolina
 The Green (Dartmouth College), a central field at Dartmouth College in Hanover, New Hampshire
 The Green Distillery, an Irish whiskey distillery in Cork City, Ireland
 The Green (film), a 2011 film starring Julia Ormond
 The Green (Frogmore, South Carolina), an NRHP listing in Beaufort County, South Carolina
 The Green, a play by Gary Owen
 The Green, a set of television programming on the Sundance Channel
 The Green, a fictional mystical realm in DC Comics inhabited by the minds of all members of the Parliament of Trees
 St Mary's CBS (The Green), a secondary school in Tralee, Ireland
 The Green railway station, a small railway station on the Ravenglass and Eskdale heritage railway in the Lake District, Cumbria
 The Green, Comber, a cricket ground in Ireland
 The Green, a small village in parish of Thwaites, Cumbria

See also
 Dartmouth Big Green
Green (disambiguation)